The 1955 Macdonald Brier, the Canadian men's national curling championship, was held from March 7 to 11, 1955 at Regina Stadium in Regina, Saskatchewan. A total of 51,725 fans attended the event, which was a Brier record at the time.

Team Saskatchewan, who was skipped by Garnet Campbell won the Brier Tankard by finishing round robin play unbeaten with a 10-0 record. This was Saskatchewan's first ever Brier championship and the ninth time in which a team finished a Brier undefeated.

The Draw 1 game between New Brunswick and Ontario was the first time that a Brier game went to a second extra end. The 14 ends were the most ends played in a game since the first Brier in 1927 when regulation games went 14 ends.

Teams
The teams are listed as follows:

Round robin standings

Round robin results
All draw times are listed in Mountain Time (UTC-07:00)

Draw 1
Monday, March 7 3:00 PM

Draw 2
Monday, March 7 8:00 PM

Draw 3
Tuesday, March 8 9:30 AM

Draw 4
Tuesday, March 8 2:30 PM

Draw 5
Wednesday, March 9 3:00 PM

Draw 6
Wednesday, March 9 8:00 PM

Draw 7
Thursday, March 10 9:30 AM

Draw 8
Thursday, March 10 2:30 PM

Draw 9
Thursday, March 10 7:30 PM

Draw 10
Friday, March 11 9:30 AM

Draw 11
Friday, March 11 2:30 PM

References

External links 
 Video: 

Macdonald Brier, 1955
Macdonald Brier, 1955
The Brier
Sports competitions in Regina, Saskatchewan
Curling in Saskatchewan
Macdonald Brier
Macdonald Brier